Tim Rogers may refer to:

 Tim Rogers (American football) (born 1966), American football coach of the Kalamazoo Hornets
 Tim Rogers (journalist) (born 1979), American video games journalist and developer
 Tim Rogers (musician) (born 1969), Australian musician, actor, and writer
 Tim Rogers, Australian singer–songwriter known better known as Jack Ladder